Jurong Secondary School (Abbreviation: JSS) is a government secondary school in Taman Jurong, Singapore. On the request of community leaders, then Prime Minister Lee Kuan Yew helped to establish the school in 1961 as Jurong Integrated Secondary School. It was then renamed to Jurong Secondary School in later years.

Presently Jurong Secondary School is located at 31, Yuan Ching Road. The school has a niche area in sports – Basketball, Volleyball and cross-country running. The school has been winning the Nationals since the 1970s. Presently, Jurong Secondary School holds the convenorship in Singapore Schools basketball. The school has its own wireless networking which facilitates in deploying e-learning technologies to all levels in the school.

Presently, JSS is starting up its Media Department supporting Singapore's thrust into EMultimedia as a viable future prospect for students. JSS's very own 'Pulse Studio' boast of numerous award-winning productions and students stars.

There are 9 classes per batch every year. However, the number of normal or express stream classes per year are based on the year's entry requirements and the number of students registering.

Recently, Jurong Secondary has been selected as one of FutureSchools@Singapore which means that Infocomm companies support the students in the chosen school who are interested in Infocomm, alongside Hwa Chong Institution and Crescent' Girls School. The current Prime Minister of Singapore, Lee Hsien Loong, the Minister of State for Education, Lui Tuck Yew and as well as foreign visitors had visited the school. It was established in the Singapore-Malaysia collaboration.

Over the years, Jurong Secondary School has become one of the better performing neighbourhood schools in the Jurong region, producing several government scholars.

Notable alumni
 Taufik Batisah: Singer, winner of the first season of Singapore Idol
 Mark Lee: Comedian, actor, TV host and film director
 Ang Mong Seng: Member of the Singapore Parliament 1997-2011

References

Secondary schools in Singapore
Jurong West
Educational institutions established in 1963
1963 establishments in Malaysia